Gajendrasinh Parmar (born 24 November 1978) is an Indian politician currently serving as a member of the Gujarat Legislative Assembly for the Bharatiya Janata Party. In addition, he serves as a director of the S.K district bank in Himatnagar. Parmar was elected to the Assembly in 2017, defeating incumbent Assemblyman Mahendrasinh Kacharsinh Baraiya by 2,551 in the Prantij constituency. He does not have any criminal record but has financial liability of 309,504 rupees.

Education 
Parmar graduated with a B.A. (Hindi) from Hemchandracharya North Gujarat University, Patan in 2010.

References 

1978 births
Living people
Gujarat politicians
People from Sabarkantha district
Gujarat MLAs 2017–2022